was a town located in Senboku District, Akita Prefecture, Japan.

In 2003, the town had an estimated population of 7,803 and a density of 145.54 persons per km2. The total area was 29.55 km2.

On March 22, 2005, Senboku, along with the city of Ōmagari; the towns of Kamioka, Kyōwa, Nakasen, Nishisenboku, Ōta; and the village of Nangai (all from Senboku District), merged to create the city of Daisen.

External links 
  

Dissolved municipalities of Akita Prefecture
Daisen, Akita